Elachista constitella is a moth of the family Elachistidae. It is found in Turkey, Italy, Croatia and Russia.

References

constitella
Moths described in 1859
Moths of Europe
Moths of Asia